Edith Cavell (1865–1915) was a WWI British nurse and martyr

Edith Cavell may also refer to:

Facilities and structures
 Edith Cavell Memorial, St Martin's Place, London, England, UK
 Edith Cavell Hospital, Westwood, Peterborough, Cambridgeshire, England, UK; a former hospital
 Edith Cavell Healthcare Campus, Westwood, Peterborough, Cambridgeshire, England, UK
 Edith Cavell Block, Brisbane General Hospital Precinct, Herston, Brisbane, Queensland, Australia
 Edith Cavell Bridge, Shotover River, Otago, South Island, New Zealand
 Edith Cavell Elementary School, Vancouver, British Columbia, Canada

Other uses
 Mount Edith Cavell, Jasper National Park, Alberta, Canada; a mountain
 Nurse Cavell (film), a 1916 Australian film, also released as Edith Cavell

See also

 
 List of dedications to Edith Cavell
 Nurse Edith Cavell (film), 1939 U.S. film 
 The Martyrdom of Nurse Cavell, 1916 Australian film
 Cavell (disambiguation)
 Edith